7866 Sicoli, provisional designation , is a stony Nysa asteroid from the inner regions of the asteroid belt, approximately 6 kilometers in diameter. It was discovered on 13 October 1982, by American astronomer Edward Bowell at Lowell's Anderson Mesa Station near Flagstaff, Arizona. The asteroid was named after Italian astronomer Piero Sicoli.

Orbit and classification 

Sicoli is a member of the stony subgroup of the Nysa family, one of the smaller families in the main-belt, named after its namesake, 44 Nysa. The body orbits the Sun in the inner main-belt at a distance of 1.9–2.9 AU once every 3 years and 9 months (1,382 days). Its orbit has an eccentricity of 0.21 and an inclination of 3° with respect to the ecliptic. The first precovery was taken at Palomar Mountain in 1954, extending the asteroid's observation arc by 28 years prior to its discovery.

Physical characteristics

Diameter and albedo 

According to the survey carried out by NASA's Wide-field Infrared Survey Explorer with its subsequent NEOWISE mission, Sicoli measures 6.3 kilometers in diameter and its surface has an albedo of 0.246, while the Collaborative Asteroid Lightcurve Link assumes a standard albedo for stony asteroids of 0.21 and calculates a diameter of 5.6 kilometers, based on an absolute magnitude of 13.3.

Lightcurves 

As of 2016, no rotational lightcurve has been obtained for this asteroid and its rotation period and shape remain unknown.

Naming 

This minor planet was named in honor of Italian astronomer Piero Sicoli (born 1954), a discoverer of minor planets and Observation Coordinator at the Sormano Astronomical Observatory in northern Italy. The official naming citation was published by the Minor Planet Center on 28 July 1999.

References

External links 
 Asteroid Lightcurve Database (LCDB), query form (info )
 Dictionary of Minor Planet Names, Google books
 Asteroids and comets rotation curves, CdR – Observatoire de Genève, Raoul Behrend
 Discovery Circumstances: Numbered Minor Planets (5001)-(10000) – Minor Planet Center
 
 

 

007866
Discoveries by Edward L. G. Bowell
Named minor planets
19821013